Complete is the third album by the country music artist Lila McCann. Her final studio album to be released, it produced only one single on the Billboard country music charts in "Come a Little Closer". After that single failed to make Top 40 on the country charts, McCann left Warner Bros. Records' roster. The track "Mighty Mighty Love" was later recorded by Ty Herndon on his 2006 album Right About Now, from which it  was released as a single. "Because of You" was later recorded by Celine Dion for limited editions of her 2002 album, A New Day Has Come. It is McCann's only album to not contain any writing credits from McCann herself.

Track listing
"Where It Used to Break" (Dave Berg, Rivers Rutherford) - 2:56
"Come a Little Closer" (Phil Douglas, Tony Marty, Jennifer Sherrill) - 3:36
"Complete" (Pebe Sebert, Anne Graham) - 3:45
"Mighty Mighty Love" (Dennis Matkosky, Tim Nichols, Darrell Brown) - 3:51
"Whisper the Words" (David Malloy, Bruce Roberts, Krystle Warren) - 4:26
"Like a Rocket" (Julie Burton, Phil O'Donnell, Noah Gordon) - 2:51
"Is It Just Me" (Greg Johnson, Randy Thomas) - 3:38
"She Remembers Love" (Liz Hengber, Rob Crosby) - 4:01
"Lost in Your Love" (Ashley Gorley, Joanna Janét) - 3:21
"Because of You" (Lisa Scott, Christi Dannemiller, Burt Collins) - 3:29

Personnel
 Lila McCann - lead vocals (all)
 Brent Mason - electric guitar (1, 4–7, 9, 10)
 Michael Landau - electric guitar (1, 4, 5, 7, 9, 10)
 Jerry McPherson - electric guitar (2, 3, 6, 8)
 B. James Lowry - acoustic guitar (all)
 Paul Franklin - steel guitar (all)
 Michael Rhodes  - bass guitar (all)
 Aubrey Haynie - mandolin (1, 7, 10), fiddle (9)
 Larry Franklin - mandolin (2, 3), fiddle (6, 8)
 Jimmy Nichols - piano, background vocals (all)
 The Nashville String Machine - strings (3, 8)
 Bergen White - string arrangements (3, 8)
 Lonnie Wilson - drums (1, 4, 5, 7, 9, 10)
 Paul Leim - drums (2, 3, 6, 8)
 Eric Darken - percussion (all)
 Stephanie Bentley - background vocals (1-4, 6–10)
 Liana Manis - background vocals (5)
 Melinda Norris - background vocals (7)

Chart performance

2001 albums
Lila McCann albums
Warner Records albums
Albums produced by David Malloy